Veterans Way/College Ave, also known as the Tempe Transportation Center, is a regional transportation center on Valley Metro Rail in Tempe, Arizona, United States. As part of the regional transportation system, it is also the location of stops on multiple bus routes. A bike station is located here.

This station has three names: Valley Metro calls the train platforms of this station Veterans Way/College Ave and the local bus bays the Tempe Transportation Center. Both are part of the same facility and immediately adjacent to Sun Devil Stadium which serves as the station's third name, as shown on the train platform signs.  Bus schedules, train maps, and local signage all refer variously to only one of the names.

Tempe Transportation Center

The Tempe Transportation Center facilities are a combination of a light rail station, bus transfer stations and a mixed use building all in the shadow of A Mountain.  The main building is composed of three stories with retail space, a transit information center and Arizona's first Bike Station all located on the first floor.  The second floor is home to the offices for the City of Tempe Transportation Department Offices and the signature element of the project, the Don Cassano Community Room which is open on the ground level to provide shading for pedestrians passing by.  On the third floor of the building are leasable office space and the City of Tempe's Transit Operations Center.  The center was designed by the Tempe-based firm Architekton with Portland, OR based OTAK Inc. and is currently under review for LEED v2.2 Platinum Certification.  The majority of the outdoor area on the site is covered with water-permeable pavers for natural drainage. Solar panels on the green roof are designed to reduce the heat island effect with local plants to help insulate the building.

Ridership

Gallery

Notable places nearby
 Tempe City Hall
 Arizona State University: Tempe Campus
 Sun Devil Stadium
 Desert Financial Arena
 Gammage Auditorium (approx. )
 Tempe Butte / A Mountain
 Mill Avenue / Downtown Tempe

See also
List of United States bike stations

References

External links
 Valley Metro map

Valley Metro Rail stations
Railway stations in the United States opened in 2008
2008 establishments in Arizona
United States bike stations
Leadership in Energy and Environmental Design certified buildings
Buildings and structures in Tempe, Arizona
Railway stations in the United States at university and college campuses